The 1995 Speedway Grand Prix of Denmark was the fifth race of the 1995 Speedway Grand Prix season. It took place on 9 September in the Speedway Center in Vojens, Denmark.

Starting positions draw 

The Speedway Grand Prix Commission nominated Lars Gunnestad as Wild Card.

Heat details

The intermediate classification

See also 
 Speedway Grand Prix
 List of Speedway Grand Prix riders

References

External links 
 FIM-live.com
 SpeedwayWorld.tv

Speedway Grand Prix of Denmark
D
1995